Ehretia is a genus of flowering plants in the borage family, Boraginaceae. It contains about 50 species. The generic name honors German botanical illustrator Georg Dionysius Ehret (1708–1770).

Species
Accepted species and other notable taxa

Ehretia acuminata  – Koda (East Asia, New Guinea, eastern Australia)
Ehretia alba 
Ehretia amoena 
Ehretia anacua  – Anacua (Texas in the United States, Mexico)
Ehretia angolensis 
Ehretia aspera 
Ehretia asperula 
Ehretia australis 
Ehretia bakeri 
Ehretia changjiangensis 
Ehretia coerulea 
Ehretia confinis 
Ehretia cortesia 
Ehretia corylifolia 
Ehretia cymosa 
Ehretia decaryi 
Ehretia densiflora 
Ehretia dichotoma 
Ehretia dicksonii 
Ehretia dolichandra 
Ehretia dunniana 
†Ehretia europaea E.M. Reid
Ehretia exsoluta 
Ehretia glandulosissima 
Ehretia grahamii 
Ehretia hainanensis 
Ehretia janjalle 
Ehretia javanica 
Ehretia kaessneri 
Ehretia keyensis 
Ehretia laevis  Roxb., synonym of Ehretia aspera Willd.
Ehretia latifolia 
Ehretia lengshuikengensis 
Ehretia longiflora 
Ehretia macrophylla 
Ehretia matthewii 
Ehretia meyersii 
Ehretia microcalyx 
Ehretia microphylla 
Ehretia mollis 
Ehretia moluccana 
Ehretia namibiensis 
Ehretia obtusifolia 
Ehretia papuana 
Ehretia parallela 
Ehretia philippinensis 
Ehretia phillipsonii 
Ehretia pingbianensis 
Ehretia psilosiphon 
Ehretia resinosa 
Ehretia retusa 
Ehretia rigida  – Deurmekaarbos (Southeastern Africa)
Ehretia rosea 
Ehretia saligna 
Ehretia scrobiculata 
Ehretia seyrigii 
Ehretia siamensis 
Ehretia silvana 
Ehretia timorensis 
Ehretia tinifolia 
Ehretia trachyphylla 
Ehretia tsangii 
Ehretia urceolata 
Ehretia wallichiana 
Ehretia wightiana 
Ehretia winitii

Fossil record
†Ehretia europaea fossil seeds of the Chattian stage, Oligocene, are known from the Oberleichtersbach Formation in the Rhön Mountains, central Germany. Endocarp fossils have been described from the Late Miocene locality of Pont-de-Gail in France and from the southern border of the Po Plain in northern Italy in two sites dated to the Zanclean and in three sites of supposed Zanclean age

Formerly placed here
 Carmona retusa (Vahl) Masam. (as E. microphylla Lam.)

Taxonomy references

References

External links

 
Boraginaceae genera